Keighley Central is a ward in City of Bradford Metropolitan District Council in the county of West Yorkshire, England. Its population is 16,276 as per the United Kingdom Census 2001, increasing to 18,255 at the 2011 Census.

It contains the centre of Keighley, together with residential areas to its north west such as Utley. It has a large Pakistani community, which was measured at 43.3% of the local population in the 2011 Census. White British residents were the second largest group with 38.7% of the population at that time.

Councillors 
Keighley Central ward is represented on Bradford Council by three councillors, Abid Hussain, Zafar Ali and Khadim Hussain.

 Abid Hussain (Lab)
 Zafar Ali (Cons)
 Khadim Hussain (Lab)

 indicates seat up for re-election.

References 

 BCSP (Internet Explorer only)
 BBC election results
 Council ward profile (pdf)

Wards of Bradford
Keighley